Little Voice is a 1998 British musical film written and directed by Mark Herman and made in Scarborough, North Yorkshire. The film starred Jane Horrocks, Michael Caine, Brenda Blethyn, Jim Broadbent and Ewan McGregor.

The screenplay is based on Jim Cartwright's 1992 play The Rise and Fall of Little Voice.

Plot
Laura Hoff, an only child, is a reclusive young woman who lives with her mother, Mari, in a working-class home in Scarborough, Yorkshire, England. She is known as LV (short for Little Voice) because of her soft, shy, and childlike speaking voice. She flees reality, hiding away in her bedroom, listening to records and impersonating the voices of American and British artists such as Marilyn Monroe, Gracie Fields, Judy Garland, and Shirley Bassey; her love of songs is her only source of strength since her beloved father's death. Her mother, a promiscuous woman with countless affairs, dumps a man when her passion wanes.

Billy, a telephone engineer who installs their new telephone, approaches LV on the pretense of giving her information pamphlets. Things improve when Mari is seeing Ray Say, who manages third-rate acts; he hears the girl sing, spots her gift, and vows to make her a star, while Mari, who dislikes singing, still doubts her. Ray arranges for LV to sing at a club owned by Mr. Boo. But her performance is a failure as she is overcome by stage fright and only sings a few lines. Ray sees that LV needs encouragement on stage and works with Mr. Boo to organize a big band, lights, and a new dress to give her confidence.

Ray gives her a pep talk, persuading her to perform by portraying her act as a tribute to her father. LV agrees to sing again, but only as a one-off. LV envisions her father sitting in the club as she performs; she brings the house down and is a storming success. Ray thinks she is his ticket to the big time and arranges for a London agent to come and see LV perform the following night. As Ray, Mari and Mr. Boo toast their future success, LV murmurs that she agreed to sing only one time and slumps to the floor.

The following night LV passively remains in her bed while the selfish natures of Ray and Mari are very much revealed: Ray's futile attempts to goad LV are dashed, and Mari still scorns and prods her. At the cabaret club, the London agent finally loses patience after several third-rate acts fill the time in LV's absence and leave. Ray storms into the club and sings "It's Over" on stage, as his career, disappears before everyone's eyes.

Meanwhile, the faulty wiring at LV's home finally starts a fire, trapping LV in her upper room where she is rescued by Billy. In a final showdown with her mother, after being wrongly accused by her mother of arson, LV responds by screaming in her mother's face. Blaming her for her father's death and blaming her own meek nature on Mari's domineering attitude, she walks away saying her name isn't Little Voice, it's Laura.

Mari is left by everyone, Ray is facing his debt collectors, and Laura is saved by her discovery of self-confidence.

Cast

In addition, Graham Turner portrays LV’s father, in photos and in her imagination.

Reception

Critical response
Rotten Tomatoes gives the film an 80% rating based on 49 reviews with the consensus: "Little Voice brings its award-winning source material to the screen in style, elevated by a commanding lead performance from Jane Horrocks."

Janet Maslin wrote in her New York Times review, "Horrocks's phenomenal mimicry of musical grande dames from Marlene Dietrich to Marilyn Monroe, lavishing special loving care on Judy Garland, makes a splendid centerpiece for the otherwise more ordinary film built around it."

Roger Ebert of the Chicago Sun-Times felt the story was "amusing but uneven" and that the film "seems to have all the pieces in place for another one of those whimsical, comic British slices of life. But the movie doesn't quite deliver the way we think it will. One problem is that the Michael Caine character, sympathetic and funny in the opening and middle scenes, turns mean at the end for no good reason. Another is that the romance, and a manufactured crisis, distract from the true climax of the movie. That would be Jane Horrocks' vocal performance ... she is amazing. Absolutely fabulous."

In Variety, Derek Elley called the film "a small picture with a big heart", adding, "The film has almost everything going for it, with the exceptions of a somewhat lopsided structure in which the climax comes two-thirds of the way through and a romantic subplot that plays like an afterthought. Nevertheless, smooth direction by Mark Herman and juicy performances by a host of Brit character actors ... ensure an entertaining ride ... Horrocks, whose combo of gamin physique and big vocal talent make the title role seem unthinkable for any other actress, is a revelation, handling moments of solo emotion and onstage strutting with equal, moving panache."

Accolades

Soundtrack 
The following songs are performed by Horrocks:
 "The Man that Got Away" by Harold Arlen and Ira Gershwin
 "Lover Man (Oh Where Can You Be)" by Jimmy Davis, Jimmy Shern, and Roger Ramirez
 "Over the Rainbow" by Harold Arlen and E. Y. Harburg
 "Chicago" by Fred Fisher
 "Big Spender" by Cy Coleman and Dorothy Fields
 "I Wanna Be Loved By You" by Harry Ruby, Herbert Stothart, and Bert Kalmar
 "Sing As We Go" by Harry Parr Davies
 "Falling in Love Again" by Frederick Hollander and Samuel Lerner
 "Get Happy" by Harold Arlen and Ted Koehler

The film also features Michael Caine singing "It's Over", as performed by Roy Orbison.

References

External links
 
 
 

1990s musical drama films
1998 films
1998 independent films
British drama films
British films based on plays
Films featuring a Best Musical or Comedy Actor Golden Globe winning performance
Films set in Yorkshire
Films shot in North Yorkshire
Scarborough, North Yorkshire
Films produced by Elizabeth Karlsen
1998 drama films
Films directed by Mark Herman
1990s English-language films
1990s British films